Jochen Herbst (born 16 October 1942) is a retired German swimmer. He competed in the 4×200 m freestyle relay at the 1968 Summer Olympics and finished in seventh place. During his career he won eight national titles in the 200 m (1962, 1969), 400 m (1962), 1500 m (1962), 4×100 m (1963, 1965) and 4×200 m (1963, 1965) freestyle events.

He married Eva Wittke, a German swimmer who also competed at the 1968 Olympics. Their daughter Sabine Herbst-Klenz (born 1974) and son Stefan Herbst are also retired Olympic swimmers.

References

1942 births
Living people
German male swimmers
Olympic swimmers of East Germany
Swimmers at the 1968 Summer Olympics
German male freestyle swimmers
Sportspeople from Halle (Saale)